Magdalena (Magda) Titirici is a Professor of Sustainable Energy Materials at Imperial College London.

Early life and education 
Titirici was born in Bucharest, where she studied chemistry at the University of Bucharest and graduated in 1999. She earned her PhD at the Technical University of Dortmund in 2005, working on molecularly imprinted polymers for her undergraduate studies. Titirici also worked at the Johannes Gutenberg University Mainz during her postgraduate studies. She then completed her postdoctoral studies at the Max Planck Institute of Colloids and Interfaces, where she then took on the job of group leader. She also received her habilitation in 2013 at the same university. Titirici joined Queen Mary University of London in 2013 as a Reader, before being promoted to Professor in 2014. In 2019 she moved to the Chemical Engineering Department of Imperial College London, leading a multidisciplinary and diverse research group in the field of Sustainable Energy Materials. She has been named Royal Academy of Engineering's Chair of Sustainable Energy Materials for Emerging Technologies, and will be funded over 10 years to develop renewable energy technologies.

Research 
Her group uses biomass and hydrothermal processes to create carbon products. She is interested in how these carbon nanomaterials produced by hydrothermal carbonisation (HTC) can be used in electrocatalytical reactions, including oxygen reduction and oxygen evolution. They also work on electrodes for energy storage in lithium and sodium ion batteries. She leads a large research group who work on several projects focused on sustainable materials. They have published over 130 publications in peer-reviewed scientific journals. She contributed to the book Global Sustainability: A Nobel Cause.

Awards 
 2021 - Royal Society Kavli Medal and Lecture
 2021 – Institute of Materials, Minerals and Mining A. A. Griffith Medal and Prize
 2018 – Royal Society of Chemistry Corday-Morgan Prize
 2018 – Chinese Academy of Science President Fellowship
 2017 – Universal Scientific Education and Research Network Laureate
 2017 – Honorary Doctorate from Stockholm University
 2016 – Institute of Materials, Minerals and Mining Rosenhain Medal

References 

Scientists from Bucharest
Romanian women chemists
Romanian women scientists
Romanian chemists
University of Bucharest alumni
Academics of Queen Mary University of London
Year of birth missing (living people)
Living people